In archaeology, a tell or tel (borrowed into English from , , 'mound' or 'small hill'), is an artificial topographical feature, a species of mound consisting of the accumulated and stratified debris of a succession of consecutive settlements at the same site, the refuse of generations of people who built and inhabited them, and of natural sediment.

Tells are most commonly associated with the ancient Near East, but they are also found elsewhere, such as Southern and parts of Central Europe, from Greece and Bulgaria to Hungary and Spain and in North Africa. Within the Near East, they are concentrated in less arid regions, including Upper Mesopotamia, the Southern Levant, Anatolia and Iran, which had more continuous settlement. Eurasian tells date to the Neolithic, the Neolithic/Chalcolithic, and the Bronze Age/Iron Age era. In the Southern Levant the time of the tells ended with the conquest by Alexander the Great, which ushered in the Hellenistic period with its own, different settlement-building patterns. Many tells across the Near East continue to be occupied and used today.

Etymology
The word tell is first attested in English in an 1840 report in the Journal of the Royal Geographical Society. It is derived from the Arabic  meaning 'mound' or 'hillock'. Variant spellings include tall, tel, til, and tal. 

The Arabic word has many cognates in  other Semitic languages, such as Akkadian , Ugaritic , and Hebrew . The Akkadian form is similar to Sumerian , which can also refer to a 'pile' of any material, like grain, but it is not known whether the similarity reflects a borrowing from that language, or if the Sumerian term itself was a loanword from an earlier Semitic substrate language. If Akkadian  is related to another word in that language, meaning 'woman's breast', there exists a similar term in the South Semitic classical Ethiopian language of Geʽez, namely , 'breast'. Hebrew  first appears in the biblical book of Deuteronomy  (ca. 500–700 BCE), describing a heap or small mound, and appearing in the books of Joshua and Jeremiah with the same meaning.

These often appear in place names, and the word itself is one of the most common prefixes for Palestinian toponyms. The Arabic word khirbet, also spelled khirbat, meaning 'ruin', also occurs in the names of many archaeological tells, such as Khirbet et-Tell (roughly meaning 'heap of ruins').

Formation
A tell can only be formed if natural and man-produced material accumulates faster than it is removed by erosion and human-caused truncation, which explains the limited geographical area they occur in.

Tells are formed from a variety of remains, including organic and cultural refuse, collapsed mudbricks and other building materials, water-laid sediments, residues of biogenic and geochemical processes, and aeolian sediment. A classic tell looks like a low, truncated cone with sloping sides and a flat, mesa-like top.

Occurrence

Southwest Asia

It is thought that the earliest examples of tells are to be found in the Jordan Valley, such as at the 10 meter-high mound, dating back to the proto-Neolithic period, at Jericho in the West Bank. Upwards of 5,000 tells have been detected in the area of ancient Israel and Jordan. Of these Paul Lapp calculated in the 1960s that 98% had yet to be touched by archaeologists.

In Syria, tells are abundant in the Upper Mesopotamia region, in which they scatter along the Euphrates, including Tell al-'Abr, Tell Bazi, Tell Kabir, Tell Mresh, Tell Saghir and Tell Banat. The latter is thought to be the site of the oldest war memorial (known as the White Monument), dated back to the 3rd millennium BCE.

Europe
Tells can be found in Europe in countries like Spain, Hungary, Romania, Bulgaria, North Macedonia, and Greece.

Northeastern Bulgaria has a rich archaeological heritage of eneolithic tells from the 5th millennium BCE.

In Neolithic Greece, there is a contrast between the northern Thessalian plain where rainfall was sufficient to permit densely populated settlements based on dry-farming and the more dispersed sites in southern Greece, such as the Peloponesus, where early villages sprang up around the smaller arable tracts close to springs, lakes and marshes. There are two models to account for the tell structures of this part of southern Europe, one developed by Paul Halstead and the other by John Chapman. Chapman envisaged the tell as witness to a nucleated communal society, whereas Halstead emphasized the idea that they arose as individual household structures. Thessalian tells often reflect small hamlets with a small population of around 40–80.

The Toumbas of Macedonia and the Magoulas of Thessaly are the local names for tell sites in these regions of Greece.

See also
 List of tells
 Acropolis 
 Archaeological site 
 Midden

Notes and references

Explanatory notes

References

Bibliography

External links

Ancient Near East
Archaeological sites in the Near East
Mounds